This is a list of albums that charted in the top ten of the ARIA Album Charts, an all-genre albums chart, in 2018.

Top-ten albums
The list is sorted chronologically by issue date with the date representing the first issue in which the album appeared in the top ten in 2018, regardless of whether an album charted in a previous year or not. Dates reached peak position are in 2018 unless otherwise noted.

Key
An asterisk (*) represents that the album is in the top ten as of the week ending on 17 December 2018.

See also
ARIA Charts
List of number-one albums of 2018 (Australia)
List of top 10 albums in 2017 (Australia)
List of top 10 singles in 2018 (Australia)

References 

2018 in Australian music
Australia Albums Top 10
Australian record charts